The Chilean tugboat Janequeo (ATF-65) was an  of the Chilean Navy that sunk on 15 August 1965 during a devastating storm in the Bay of Manquemapu,  south of Corral, Chile with the loss of 51 men as she helped  that had run aground.

See also
 Sinking of Janequeo and Leucotón

References

External links
 Chilean Navy website, Janequeo (5.), retrieved on 26 September 2013
 NavSource Online: Service Ship Photo Archive, USS Potawatomi (ATF-109), ex USS Potawatomi (AT-109) (1944)

1943 ships
Maritime incidents in November 1944
Auxiliary ships of Chile
Maritime incidents in 1965
Shipwrecks in the Chilean Sea
Ships transferred from the United States Navy to the Chilean Navy
Abnaki-class tugs of the Chilean Navy